Beverly Anna Maria Williams (born 5 January 1957) is a female former diver who competed for Great Britain and England. Williams represented Great Britain at the 1972 Summer Olympics.

She also represented England and won a silver medal in the 10 metres platform, at the 1974 British Commonwealth Games in Christchurch, New Zealand.

References

External links 
 

1957 births
Living people
English female divers
Olympic divers of Great Britain
Divers at the 1972 Summer Olympics
Commonwealth Games medallists in diving
Commonwealth Games silver medallists for England
Divers at the 1974 British Commonwealth Games
Medallists at the 1974 British Commonwealth Games